The Third Amendment to the Constitution of Pakistan (Urdu: آئین پاکستان میں تیسری ترمیم) is an amendment to the Constitution of Pakistan that went into effect on 18 February 1975 during the government of Prime Minister Zulfikar Ali Bhutto. The amendment extended the period of preventive detention of those who were accused of committing serious cases of treason and espionage against the State of Pakistan, and were also under trial by the government of Pakistan. The amendment was aimed to provide protection against the abuse of government authority in legal procedure, and extended the investigation period from one month to three months.

Text

References

External links
 Full-text of the third amendment

03
Government of Zulfikar Ali Bhutto